John Walter Lawrence Clegg (born 9 July 1934) is an Indian-born English actor, best known for playing the part of Gunner 'Paderewski' Graham in the BBC sitcom It Ain't Half Hot Mum.

Early life and career
Clegg was born on 9 July 1934 in Murree, British India (present-day Pakistan) to English parents. When he and his parents arrived back in England, Clegg became a student at RADA. After leaving RADA  Clegg joined the Watford Palace Theatre Company, where he met Jimmy Perry, who would go on to cast Clegg in the role for which he is best known. It was there that he also met many of his future co-stars, including Michael Knowles, Donald Hewlett, and Mavis Pugh (whom he married in 1959). Pugh appeared in Croft and Perry sitcoms including Dad's Army, It Ain't Half Hot Mum and Hi-de-Hi!, but she is best known for playing Lady Lavender Southwick in You Rang, M'Lord?. Due to the twenty year age gap between Clegg and Pugh many were sceptical as to whether the marriage would last, apart from Jimmy Perry and his wife Gillian. After the wedding there was a whip-round at the theatre which collected enough money to buy what Clegg described in an interview as ‘lots of practical things, like sponges and cloths - the most practical things you could imagine.’

During his time at Watford, Clegg appeared in many performances including farces such as Charley's Aunt and The Happiest Days of Your Life. He also appeared in thrillers such as Gas Light.

Later television and film career
Clegg's first television role was as D.C. Greaves in Dixon of Dock Green in 1961. Clegg’s first film appearance was as a minor role in the 1967 musical film Half a Sixpence, playing a shop assistant. He then went on to make many television appearances including the dramatised documentary The Gunpowder Plot in which he playing Francis Tresham, during the documentary he started alongside Martin Shaw which he later featured alongside in Death in Holy Order in 2003. In 1973 he was cast in the BBC sitcom It Ain't Half Hot Mum as Gunner Graham, the concert party’s pianist. The show ran for eight series and Clegg appeared in all 56 episodes, however Clegg did not appear in the 1979 stage adaptation of the series. Instead, the role was taken up by David Rowley, who was able to play the piano live on stage. Since It Ain't Half Hot Mum he has made numerous television and film appearances including Dad's Army, Are You Being Served? and Bless This House. Between 2 August and 17 August 1978 Clegg appeared as Clifford Howes in the soap opera Crossroads. In 1979, he made an appearance in the television adaptation of the Shakespeare play Measure for Measure, in which he played Froth, the foolish gentleman. In 1981, he appeared with various other members of the It Ain't Half Hot Mum cast in game show Family Fortunes, which saw them go head to head with the hosts of the show Give Us a Clue. In 1995 he appeared as a guest on David Croft's appearance on This Is Your Life. Clegg had a recurring role in the sitcom You Rang, M'Lord? in which he played Mr Franklyn the Meldrum family physician; in the series he featured alongside many actors who he had previously worked with on It Ain't Half Hot Mum including Michael Knowles and Donald Hewlett.

In 1982, Clegg made a return to the theatre, co-producing with his wife a one-man show about Rudyard Kipling  which achieved success at the Edinburgh Festival Fringe.

During the 1990s, Clegg had a bit part in Tom & Viv (1994) and played a vicar in the 1997 film Shooting Fish alongside Dan Futterman and Stuart Townsend. In the same year Clegg featured alongside Helena Bonham Carter and Richard E. Grant in the British romantic comedy Keep the Aspidistra Flying (released in the USA and New Zealand as A Merry War), which was based on the novel by George Orwell. He has most recently been in the 2001 film Bridget Jones's Diary (playing an unnamed elderly man), the 2003 television film Death in Holy Orders, which was based on the book by P. D. James (with Clegg playing the role of Father John Betterton), and the 2006 short Tommy the Kid in which he played a police officer.

Acting credits

1961: Dixon of Dock Green - D.C. Greaves - 1 episode 
1962: Dr. Finlay's Casebook - Dr. Mitchell - 1 episode 
1963: Compact - Captain Hicks - 1 episode 
1965: Fothergale Co. Lt. - Shop assistant - 1 episode 
1967: Half a Sixpence - Shop assistant
1968: The Gunpowder Plot - Francis Tresham
1971: Whack-O! - Proctor - 1 episode 
1972: Father, Dear Father - Vicar - 1 episode 
1972: Lollipop Loves Mr Mole - Taxi Driver - 1 episode 
1972: Dad's Army - Wireless Operator - 1 episode 
1973: Bless This House - Waiter - 1 episode 
1973: Thirty Minutes Worth - Umbrella Salesmen - 1 episode 
1974: My Name Is Harry Worth - Shop assistant - 1 episode 
1974-75: Are You Being Served? - Customer - 2 episodes
1974-81: It Ain't Half Hot Mum - Gunner Graham - 56 episodes
1975: The Tommy Cooper Hour - 1 episode 
1975: Comedy Playhouse - Gerald - 1 episode 
1975: Hogg’s Back - Policeman - 3 episodes
1976: Whodunnit? - Brother Paul - 1 episode 
1978: Crossroads - Clifford Howes - 7 episodes
1979: Measure for Measure - Froth
1979: Spooner's Patch - Vicar - 2 episodes 
1981: Keep It in the Family - Vicar - 1 episode 
1982: Summer Festival - Rudyard Kipling - 1 episode 
1987: Three Up, Two Down - Max - 1 episode 
1989: The Nineteenth Hole - Sam - 1 episode 
1990: You Rang, M'Lord? - Mr. Franklyn - 2 episodes
1991: Doctor at the Top - Dinner Guest - 1 episode 
1993: Demob - Camera - 1 episode 
1994: Tom & Viv - second man
1994: Mr. Bean - Calligrapher - 1 episode 
1995: Coogan's Run - Alf - 1 episode 
1997: Shooting Fish - Church Vicar
1997: Keep the Aspidistra Flying - Mckechnie
2001: Bridget Jones's Diary - Elderly man
2003: Death in Holy Order - Father John Betterton
2006: Tommy the Kid - Police Officer

Guest appearances 

 1976: This Is Your Life (Windsor Davies)
 1981: Family Fortunes
 1995: This Is Your Life (David Croft)
 2009: The Dad's Army Podcast

References

External links

John Clegg at the BBC Comedy Guide

English male film actors
English male television actors
Living people
1934 births
People from Murree
20th-century English male actors
21st-century English male actors